Lost & Found Music Studios is a Canadian musical-drama children's series created by Frank van Keeken and aired by Family Channel. The series is produced by Temple Street Productions and Beachwood Canyon Productions. It is a music-centered spinoff of the dance-focused The Next Step, using a similar mockumentary format and sharing characters and locations; the main characters of Lost & Found initially appeared in the third season of The Next Step. The series premiered on December 11, 2015 on Family Channel, running for two seasons of 27 episodes, and airing its final episode on March 31, 2017.

Premise

"A live music venue, recording studio and jam space, Lost & Found is an amazing place where young musicians go to become great. Members immerse themselves in music, write songs record tracks and form bands in hopes of turning their passion into a profession. But, if making it in the music industry wasn’t hard enough, these aspiring artists also have to deal with the many issues teens face including first crushes, peer pressure, difficult home lives and trying to fit in."

Cast and characters

Main
 Shane Harte as Luke, lead singer and guitarist for the band Lost & Found, and a songwriter
 Alex Zaichkowski as John, the lead guitarist of Lost & Found, and a songwriter
 Keara Graves as Leia, a singer-songwriter who has been with the program for two years, she views herself as the best songwriter in the program. She has a crush on Luke.
 Sarah Carmosino as Rachel, a singer and songwriter with self-confidence issues, and Leia's best friend
 Levi Randall as Theo, the quirky bassist of the Lost & Found band
 Deshaun Clarke as Jude, a confident rapper
 Ella Jonas Farlinger as Eva, a shy singer and songwriter with strict parents
 Katrina Hachey as Hannah, a singer and guitarist
 Trevor Tordjman as James, a former dancer with The Next Step and a drummer for the Lost & Found band, though he is not in the music program

 Rakim Kelly as Isaac, a young singer from a tough neighborhood who auditions to join the Lost & Found music program
 Olivia Solo as Annabelle, a nervous singer-songwriter who auditions to join the Lost & Found music program but blows her audition when she learns the wrong song
 Matthew Bacik as Nate, a singer and keyboardist with an oppressive stage mother who auditions to join the Lost & Found music program
 Maranda Thomas as Mary, Jackie's older sister, and a singer who auditions to get into the Lost & Found music program
 Alyssa Baker as Maggie, a musician and singer-songwriter from a small town who auditions to join the Lost & Found music program
 Jeni Ross as Clara, a young singer, Giselle's sister, who auditions to join the Lost & Found music program
 Victoria Baldesarra as Michelle, a dancer at The Next Step
 Brittany Raymond as Riley, a dancer at The Next Step

Recurring
 Jordan Clark as Giselle, a dancer at The Next Step
 Ian Matthews as Thomas, John's imposing widower father
 Ali Milner as Parker, the studio manager at Lost & Found Music Studios
 Michael Torontow as Mr. T, a music producer and the owner of the Lost & Found Music Studios

 Lovell Adams-Gray as Tully, Isaac's older brother, who runs with a bad crew, and is also known as the musical act Paradox

 Bailey Pelkman as Britney, a singer who is auditioning for the second year in a row to get into the Lost & Found music program

 Lauren Thomas as Jackie, Mary's younger sister

Guest stars
 Tyler Shaw as himself (in "Dancing in the Rain")
 Brenda Bazinet as Ruth, John's grandmother (in "Callin' Callin' Part 2", "The Sound of Change")
 Kerri Smith as Connie, Eva's strict mother (in "Rhythm Is My Heartbeat", "Wondering", "You Could Have It All")

Episodes

Season 1 (2015–16)

Season 2 (2016–17)

Broadcast and release
The series was aired by Family Channel in Canada, premiering on December 11, 2015, and on CBBC in the United Kingdom. In the United States and globally, the series was released by Netflix, with the first season launched on April 1, 2016, and the second season released on December 3, 2016. The series departed Netflix internationally in December 2021.

References

External links

2015 Canadian television series debuts
2017 Canadian television series endings
2010s Canadian teen drama television series
2010s Canadian music television series
Television series by Temple Street Productions